The Symphonie 32, or just Symphonie, is a French sailboat that was designed by Philippe Briand as a cruiser and first built in 1979.

The design is based on a prototype International Offshore Rule Three-Quarter Ton class racer.

Production
The design was built by Jeanneau in France, from 1978 to 1984 with 367 boats completed, but it is now out of production.

Design
The Symphonie 32 is a recreational keelboat, built predominantly of fiberglass, with wood trim. The hull is single skin polyester fiberglass, while the deck is balsa-cored polyester  fiberglass. The boat has a masthead sloop rig, with a deck-stepped mast, a single set of spreaders and aluminum spars with continuous stainless steel wire rigging. The hull has a raked stem; a reverse transom; an internally mounted spade-type rudder controlled by a tiller and a fixed, deep draft fin keel, a shoal draft keel or keel and retractable steel centerboard. It displaces  and carries  of exterior cast iron ballast.

The design has sleeping accommodation for six people, with a double "V"-berth in the bow cabin, a "U"-shaped settee and a straight settee in the main cabin and an aft cabin with a single berth on the starboard side. The galley is located on the port side at the companionway ladder. The galley is "U"-shaped and is equipped with a two-burner stove, an ice box and a double sink. A navigation station is opposite the galley, on the starboard side. The head is located just aft of the bow cabin on the port side and includes a shower.

See also
List of sailing boat types

References

External links

Keelboats
1970s sailboat type designs
Sailing yachts
Sailboat type designs by Philippe Briand
Sailboat types built by Jeanneau